Mohsina Kidwai (born 1 January 1932) is a leader of Indian National Congress party, she belongs to Barabanki, Uttar Pradesh.
Currently she is a member of Rajya Sabha, elected from Chhattisgarh., She is a member of the Congress Working Committee (CWC), the highest decision making body of the Indian Congress Party as well as the All India Congress Committee (A.I.C.C.)

Career
Mohsina Kidwai has held several ministerial offices in Government of Uttar Pradesh and Government of India.

Kidwai has held a variety of leadership positions within the Congress party including General Secretary of AICC. Kidwai is known for her proximity to Congress Party Chief, Sonia Gandhi.

Currently she is a member of Rajya Sabha, elected from Raipur, Chhattisgarh.

She is also a member of Congress Working Committee and convenor of Manifesto Implementation Committees of Assamese and Punjab.

Personal life
Mohsina Kidwai was married on 17 December 1953 to Khalil R. Kidwai. She has three daughters.

Positions held

She has held following positions during her career:

References

External links
 Statements by Kidwai as member of Indian delegation to UN

Indian Muslims
People from Barabanki district
People from Banda, Uttar Pradesh
1932 births
Living people
All India Indira Congress (Tiwari) politicians
Indian National Congress politicians from Uttar Pradesh
India MPs 1977–1979
India MPs 1980–1984
India MPs 1984–1989
Members of the Cabinet of India
Aligarh Muslim University alumni
Members of the Uttar Pradesh Legislative Council
Uttar Pradesh MLAs 1974–1977
State cabinet ministers of Uttar Pradesh
Rajya Sabha members from Chhattisgarh
Lok Sabha members from Uttar Pradesh
Women members of the Uttar Pradesh Legislative Assembly
Health ministers of India
20th-century Indian women politicians
20th-century Indian politicians
Women state cabinet ministers of India
Politicians from Azamgarh district
People from Meerut district
Women union ministers of state of India
Women members of the Cabinet of India
Women in Chhattisgarh politics
Women members of the Rajya Sabha
Women members of the Lok Sabha